Kushneria phosphatilytica is a Gram-negative, phosphate-solubilizing, aerobic, rod-shaped, non-endospore-forming, halophilic and motile bacterium from the genus of Kushneria which has been isolated from sediments from the Jimo-Daqiao saltern in China.

References

Oceanospirillales
Bacteria described in 2020